SpaceFM was a desktop-independent, multi-panel, tabbed file manager for Linux. SpaceFM is built using the GTK+ toolkit. Available under the terms of the GNU General Public License, SpaceFM is free software.

Features 
Panels: each window can contain up to four, independently configured panels. Each of which are in turn complete file managers with their own tabbed directory content, tool/status bars, etc.
 Tabs: each panel supports multiple folder tabs
 Configurable sidepanels: showing devices, bookmarks, directory tree.
 Configurable drag&drop and clipboard functions
 Video & image thumbnails
 Search with support for IEEE Pattern Matching Notation
 Bash integration (with in app tab completion)
 Task Manager & Queue: ability background long running tasks and continue working
 Built-in VFS, udev- or HAL-based device manager
 Network support: mount nfs, ftp, smb, ssh and iso
 Customizable menu system
 Lightweight desktop management capabilities (icons, wallpaper)

History 
SpaceFM was originally developed from a fork of the legacy PCMan File Manager and later PCManFM-Mod. The internal virtual filesystem (VFS), was retained and extended.

Due to the extensive changes in many parts of the project, SpaceFM was released with its new name as an alpha test version in January 2012.

In version 0.7.5, April 2012, SpaceFM replaced udisks with direct udev support for device detection and information. It also supported multiple mount solutions including udevil (a mount program developed specifically for SpaceFM), pmount, udisks v1 or v2, or any program. This update also allowed for support of network filesystems.

In October 2012, the GTK3 version of SpaceFM was introduced, which supports GTK2 or GTK3.

Subsequent improvements include extending the features of SpaceFM's Desktop Manager, a new Menu Item Properties dialog for adding and customizing menu items, socket commands for interacting with a running instance, and an improved panel configuration memory.

As of December 2022, SpaceFM is unmaintained software, with more than 200 open issues.

References

External links 
 

Orthodox file managers
Free file managers
File managers that use GTK